This is a list of mountains of the Swiss canton of Schwyz. Schwyz is a very mountainous canton and lies almost entirely within the Alps. It is also one of the 15 cantons having summits above 2,000 metres. Topographically, the two most important summits of the canton are those of the Bös Fulen (most elevated) and the Rigi (most prominent and isolated). All of the mountains of the canton are part of the Schwyzer Alps mountain range, although not all the mountains of that range lie within the canton.

This list only includes significant summits with a topographic prominence of at least . There are 38 such summits in the canton of Schwyz and they are found in almost all its districts. All mountain heights and prominences on the list are from the largest-scale maps available.

List

References

Schwyz